A lobster is a clawed marine crustacean in the family Nephropidae.

Lobster or Lobsters may also refer to:

Other crustaceans 
 Furry lobster
 Slipper lobster
 Spiny lobster
 Squat lobster

Entertainment
 Lobster (novel), an erotic novel by Guillaume Lecasble
 The Lobster, a 2015 science fiction movie
 Lobsters (film), a 1936 British documentary
 Lobster (magazine), a British parapolitics publication
 Lobster Records, an independent record label from Santa Barbara, California
 Lobster Johnson, a Dark Horse Comics character who appears in Hellboy and his own series
 Lobster Random, a 2000 AD character
 "Lobsters", a short story by Charles Stross, subsequently incorporated into his novel Accelerando

Other uses 
 Lobster clasp, a type of jewelry fastener
 Lobster mushroom, an edible North American mushroom resembling lobster meat
 Lobster graph in graph theory
 A historical derogatory term for British soldiers
 Lobster Lake, a lake in Minnesota
 LOBSTER, a network monitoring system